The 2017–18 Wessex Football League season (known as the Sydenhams Football League (Wessex) for sponsorship reasons) was the 32nd in the history of the Wessex Football League since its establishment in 1986.

The league consists of two divisions: the Premier Division and Division One. The constitution was announced on 26 May 2017.

Premier Division
The Premier Division remained at 22 clubs after Moneyfields were promoted to the Southern League, and Fawley, Whitchurch United and Verwood Town were relegated to Division One.

Four teams joined the division:
Baffins Milton Rovers, runners-up in Division One.
Hamble Club, champions of Division One.
Petersfield Town, relegated from Southern League Division One South & West.
Shaftesbury, third-placed club in Division One.

With the suspension of ground grading Grade E for this season and the creation of a new league at Steps 3 and 4, the champions of all Step 5 leagues were compulsorily promoted to Step 4. Of the fourteen runners-up, the twelve clubs with the best PPG (points per game ratio) were also to be compulsorily promoted, but with resignations and mergers in leagues above, thirteen runners-up were promoted.

Teams at Step 5 without ground grading Grade F were to be relegated to Step 6, but no club in this division failed the ground grading process. All Step 5 leagues were fixed at 20 clubs for 2018–19, but in this case there were no further relegations or reprieves.

League table

Division One
Division One was reduced from 21 to 19 clubs after Baffins Milton Rovers, Hamble Club and Shaftesbury were promoted to the Premier Division, Fleet Spurs were transferred to the Combined Counties League, and Pewsey Vale were transferred to the Hellenic League.

Three clubs joined the division:
Fawley, relegated from the Premier Division.
Verwood Town, relegated from the Premier Division.
Whitchurch United, relegated from the Premier Division.

Reserve sides are not eligible for promotion to Step 5.

Step 6 clubs without ground grading Grade G were to be relegated to Step 7, but no club in this division failed the ground grading process. All Step 6 leagues were fixed at a maximum of 20 clubs for 2018–19, but in this case there were no further relegations or reprieves.

League table

References

External links
 Wessex Football League official site

Wessex Football League seasons
9